Bernhard Pils (born 20 October 1961) is a former professional tennis player from Austria.

Career
Pils was a semi-finalist in the boys' singles event at the 1979 French Open.

In 1982 Australian Open, Pils competed in both the men's singles and doubles draws. He had a five set win over Mark Kratzmann in the opening round and came close to beating American Mike Estep in the second round, claiming the first two sets and taking the third into a tiebreak, but ultimately lost in another five set match. His doubles campaign ended in the first round, where he and partner Peter Feigl were beaten by Dale Collings and Cliff Letcher.

Pils defeated both Christian Jessel and Juan Avendaño to make the round of 16 at the Kitzbühel Open in 1984. The following year he was a quarter-finalist at the Lorraine Open, after wins over Loïc Courteau and Thomas Högstedt.

The Austrian represented his country in six Davis Cup ties and won five rubbers, all in singles.

References

1961 births
Living people
Austrian male tennis players
Tennis players from Vienna